This is a list of seasons played by Sepahan Football Club in Iranian and Asian football, from 1974 to the most recent completed season. It details the club's achievements in major competitions, and the top scorers for each season. Top scorers in bold were also the top scorers in the Iranian league that season.

Seasons

Key

P = Played
W = Games won
D = Games drawn
L = Games lost
F = Goals for
A = Goals against
Pts = Points
Pos = Final position

CWC = Asian Cup Winners Cup 
ACL = AFC Champions League
LL = Local League
TJC = Takht Jamshid Cup 
IL = Isfahan League 
QL = Qods League
Div 1 = Azadegan League
IPL = Iran Pro League
PGL = Persian Gulf Pro League

See also 
Sepahan
Takht Jamshid Cup
Azadegan League
Iran Pro League
Hazfi Cup

References
Iran Premier League Stats
RSSSF database about Iranian league football.

Seasons
 
Sepahan